Ealing Art College (or Ealing Technical College & School of Art) was a further education institution on St Mary's Road, Ealing, London, England. The site today is the Ealing campus of University of West London.

History
In the early 1960s the School of Art was composed of  Fashion, Graphics, Industrial Design, Photography and Fine Art Departments, and the college was attended by notable musicians Freddie Mercury, Ronnie Wood and Pete Townshend.

The College offered External London University courses in the 1960s.  The BA degree and BSc Economics with specialisation in various components like Geography, Economics and Law, attracted many British and foreign students, and also lecturers from various London University Colleges.

There was also a School of Liberal Arts that offered secretarial and undergraduate language courses in French, Spanish, German and Russian and included a semester at L'ecole d'interpretes, University of Geneva. It was considered revolutionary at the time.

The two-year Groundcourse was held in the annexe to the Art School. The "Groundcourse" was a radical and influential experiment in art education, led by Roy Ascott with a team of artists including R B Kitaj and Anthony Benjamin.  For a few years in the 1970s, the college had a separate campus at Woodlands Avenue, Acton, where the Schools of Librarianship and Management were based.

Notable alumni

Artists
 Vic Duppa-Whyte – Paper engineer, pop-up books creator
 Michael English – English psychedelic artist-musician with Hapshash and the Coloured Coat
 Gideon Gechtman – Israeli artist and sculptor
 Alan Lee – English illustrator (won an Oscar for his work on the Lord of the Rings movie)
 Arthur Ted Powell – advertising art director and artist
 Barbara Tate – artist and author
 Stephen Willats - artist
 Fiona Adams - Photographer. Took the 'Jumping Beatles' picture John Lennon chose for the cover of their 1963 EP Twist and Shout

Musicians
 Pete Townshend – lead guitarist of The Who
 Freddie Mercury – lead singer of Queen
 Tim Staffell – lead singer and bassist of Smile, precursor band to Queen
 Roger Ruskin Spear – saxophonist, robots and theremin leg in The Bonzo Dog Doo-Dah Band
 Ronnie Wood – guitarist of Faces and The Rolling Stones

Officials
 Sergei Ivanov –  Russian senior official and statesman; studied English language here from 1974.

Writers and journalists
 Michael Molloy – ex-editor of the Daily Mirror and Sunday Mirror
 Robert Rankin – best-selling author, illustrator and sculptor
 Michael Lawrence – author of many books for children and young adults
 John Van der Kiste – author (his novel Always There is based partly on his student days at Ealing)

References

Education in the London Borough of Ealing
Art schools in London